The Indonesian television mystery music game show I Can See Your Voice Indonesia premiered the inaugural first season on MNCTV on 29 August 2016.

Gameplay

Format
Under the original format, the guest artist can eliminate one or two mystery singers after each round. The game concludes with the last mystery singer standing which depends on the outcome of a duet performance with a guest artist.

Rewards
If the singer is good, he/she will feature on a privilege video; if the singer is bad, he/she wins .

Rounds
Each episode presents the guest artist with seven people whose identities and singing voices are kept concealed until they are eliminated to perform on the "stage of truth" or remain in the end to perform the final duet.

Episodes

Guest artists

Panelists

Notes

References

I Can See Your Voice Indonesia
2016 Indonesian television seasons